The 2009 Mid-American Conference baseball tournament took place from May 20 through 23. The top eight regular season finishers of the league's twelve teams, regardless of division, met in the double-elimination tournament held at V.A. Memorial Stadium in Chillicothe, Ohio.  won their seventh tournament championship to earn the conference's automatic bid to the 2009 NCAA Division I baseball tournament.

Seeding 
The winners of each division claim the top two seeds, with the next six teams, based on conference winning percentage claim the third through eight seeds. Kent State claimed the second seed by tiebreaker over Bowling Green, while Toledo claimed the third seed over Ball State. The teams played a two bracket, double-elimination tournament leading to a final matching the winners of each bracket.

Results

All-Tournament Team 
The following players were named to the All-Tournament Team.

Most Valuable Player 
Chris Tremblay won the Tournament Most Valuable Player award. Tremblay was an infielder for Kent State.

References 

Tournament
Mid-American Conference Baseball Tournament
Mid-American Conference baseball tournament
Mid-American Conference baseball tournament